Wachtler is a German surname. Notable persons with this name include:

 Sol Wachtler (born 1930), American lawyer and politician

See also
 Wächtler

References

 https://www.courtlistener.com/opinion/2588826/washington-post-v-ins-dept/

German-language surnames